UTC Warrington is a university technical college which opened in September 2016 in Warrington, United Kingdom. It is for students aged 14 to 19, and focuses on energy and engineering.
The UTC is sponsored by Manchester Metropolitan University and engineering companies including Sellafield Ltd, Amec Foster Wheeler, Rolls-Royce, National Nuclear Laboratories, Atkins, Fircroft Engineering, Kawasaki Robotics and Jungheinrich.

It is located in the heart of Warrington's Stadium Quarter redevelopment area, where it acts as an anchor tenant.

References

University Technical Colleges
Secondary schools in Warrington
Educational institutions established in 2016
2016 establishments in England